KNYN is an American FM radio station broadcasting on 99.1 MHz FM and is licensed to Fort Bridger, Wyoming. The station carries a country music format.

History

For much of its life, KNYN was a sister station to KEVA 1240 AM. In 2010, the owners of that station decided to lease KNYN to another entity. The station flipped formats to Country music.

2005 tower collapse
On November 14, 2005, the tower for the station collapsed due to icing and a wind storm that had moved through the area. The tower that collapsed was constructed in June 2004, following a previous collapse of the original tower, constructed in 2001.

Signal
The station's transmitter is located on Medicine Butte, north of Evanston, Wyoming, and it broadcasts 27,500 watts to almost all of Uinta County, and far western Sweetwater County. KNYN can also be heard in various parts of northern Utah.

References

External links

NYN
Country radio stations in the United States
Uinta County, Wyoming